Donald Bruce Rubin (born December 22, 1943) is an Emeritus Professor of Statistics at Harvard University, where he chaired the department of Statistics for 13 years. He also works at Tsinghua University in China and at Temple University in Philadelphia.

He is most well known for the Rubin causal model, a set of methods designed for causal inference with observational data, and for his methods for dealing with missing data.

In 1977 he was elected as a Fellow of the American Statistical Association.

Biography 
Rubin was born in Washington, D.C. into a family of lawyers. As an undergraduate Rubin attended the accelerated Princeton University PhD program where he was one of a cohort of 20 students mentored by the physicist John Wheeler (the intention of the program was to confer degrees within 5 years of freshman matriculation).  He switched to psychology and graduated in 1965.  He began graduate school in psychology at Harvard with a National Science Foundation fellowship, but because his statistics background was considered insufficient, he was asked to take introductory statistics courses.

Rubin became a PhD student again, this time in Statistics under William Cochran at the Harvard Statistics Department.  After graduating from Harvard in 1970, he began working  at the Educational Testing Service in 1971, and served as a visiting faculty member at Princeton's new statistics department.  He published his major papers on the Rubin causal model in 1974–1980, and a textbook on the subject with econometrician Guido Imbens.

References

External links 
Rubin's page on Harvard University Statistics Department website

American statisticians
Survey methodologists
Harvard University faculty
Temple University faculty
Quantitative psychologists
Educational psychologists
Princeton University alumni
1943 births
Living people
Bayesian statisticians
Fellows of the American Statistical Association
Members of the United States National Academy of Sciences
Harvard School of Engineering and Applied Sciences alumni
Corresponding Fellows of the British Academy
American educational psychologists
Mathematical statisticians